The Super Bowl XXX halftime show occurred on January 28, 1996, at the Sun Devil Stadium in Tempe, Arizona as part of Super Bowl XXX and featured American entertainer Diana Ross. The show was produced by Radio City Music Hall. The performance was  entitled Take Me Higher: A Celebration of 30 years of the Super Bowl.

Background
Ross had previously performed the national anthem at Super Bowl XVI in 1983.

Development
Ross had developed a show which would last for a duration of thirteen-and-a-half minutes. Broadcaster NBC demanded that she shorten the performance to twelve minutes. After she pleaded with them to allow her to keep the performance unabbreviated, they relented to allow her a thirteen-and-a-half minute time slot.

Synopsis
The show featured a number of Ross' songs, both from her solo career and her time in The Supremes. The show made use of pyrotechnics, special effects, and stadium card stunts. Ross made many costume changes throughout the performance.

Ross started the performance standing on a crane, which lowered her onto the stage as sparklers were illuminated on the bottom of the crane, while singing "Stop In The Name of Love". Hundreds of dancers occupied the field surrounding the stage. At the start of the performance they spelled out Ross' name. Ross's initial outfit was a red mini dress.

Ross then sang "You Keep Me Hangin' On", followed by "Baby Love", "You Can't Hurry Love", and "Why Do Fools Fall in Love".

For the next song, "Chain Reaction", Ross made a costume change into an orange and purple colored dress. Chain reaction was followed by "Reach Out and Touch (Somebody's Hand)".

For the next song, "Ain't No Mountain High Enough", a yellow-robed choir joined her.

This was followed by the song "I Will Survive".

The show ended with Ross singing "Take Me Higher" from her 1995 nineteenth studio album of the same name. Ross then looked to the sky and exclaimed, "Oh my, here comes my ride," as a helicopter came into the stadium. Ross was then was taken from the field in the helicopter.

Reception

Critical
Ross’ halftime performance has been ranked positively among Super Bowl halftime shows. Her performance was cited as The Weeknd's favorite halftime performance; he would later go on to perform for the Super Bowl LV halftime show.

Commercial
In the week following her performance, Ross' newest album, Take Me Higher, saw a 74% increase in sales, selling 3,000 copies in the week following the performance.

Set list
 "Stop In The Name Of Love"
 "You Keep Me Hangin' On"
 "Baby Love"
 "You Can't Hurry Love"
 "Why Do Fools Fall in Love"
 "Chain Reaction"
 "Reach Out and Touch (Somebody's Hand)"
 "Ain't No Mountain High Enough"
 "I Will Survive"
 "Take Me Higher"

See also
 1996 in American music
 1996 in American television

References

1996 in American music
1996 in American television
1996 in Arizona
Mass media in Tempe, Arizona
Diana Ross
030
Radio City Music Hall
January 1996 events in the United States